Benefield is an English toponymic surname from one or more of the numerous places in England called Benfield or Binfield. Notable people with this name include:

 Barry Benefield
 Daved Benefield
 David Benefield
 Jimmy Benefield
 Kim Benefield
 Sebastian Benefield

Other 
 Benefield Anechoic Facility
 Benefield Castle
 Lower Benefield
 Upper Benefield

See also 
 
 Benfield, a spelling variation

References 

English toponymic surnames